{{DISPLAYTITLE:C19H23N3O}}
The molecular formula C19H23N3O (molar mass: 309.40 g/mol, exact mass: 309.1841 u) may refer to:

 A-412,997
 Benzydamine

Molecular formulas